Crawford Township is a township in Washington County, Iowa, US.

History
Crawford Township was established in the 1840s and Crawford is the name of a family of pioneer settlers.

References

Townships in Washington County, Iowa
Townships in Iowa
1840s establishments in Iowa